Onychostoma krongnoensis is a species of cyprinid in the genus Onychostoma.

References

krongnoensis
Cyprinid fish of Asia
Fish of Vietnam
Fish described in 2015